Low Yen Ling (born 17 August 1974) is a Singaporean politician who has been serving as Mayor of South West District since 2014, Minister of State for Culture, Community and Youth and Minister of State for Trade and Industry concurrently since 2020. A member of the governing People's Action Party (PAP), she has been the Member of Parliament (MP) representing the Bukit Gombak division of Chua Chu Kang GRC since 2011. 

Prior to entering politics, Low had worked at financial institutions, a start-up venture, and the Economic Development Board (EDB). 

She made her political debut in the 2011 general election as part of a five-member PAP team contesting in Chua Chu Kang GRC and won with 61.2% of the vote.

Education
Low was educated at Dunman High School and Temasek Junior College before graduating from the Nanyang Technological University with a Bachelor of Business with second upper honours degree in financial analysis.

Career 
Low started her career in the private sector by handling commercial lending accounts for Keppel TatLee Bank and United Overseas Bank. After that, she worked at a start-up, AutoHub Private Limited, which reportedly failed. She then joined the Economic Development Board in 2001 and became the director of three divisions. In April 2011, she left the Economic Development Board and became Chief Executive Officer of Business China on 1 June 2011.

Political career 
Low was introduced as a PAP candidate on 4 April 2011 contesting as part of a five-member PAP team in Chua Chu Kang GRC during the 2011 general election. The PAP team won with 61.2% of the vote against the National Solidarity Party and Low became the Member of Parliament representing the Bukit Gombak ward of Chua Chu Kang GRC. On 1 October 2013, Low was appointed Parliamentary Secretary at the Ministry of Social and Family Development. She was given an additional appointment as Parliamentary Secretary at the Ministry of Culture, Community and Youth on 1 May 2014. On 27 May 2014, she was appointed Mayor of the South West District and Chairperson of the Mayors' Committee.

During the 2015 general election, Low contested as part of a four-member PAP team in Chua Chu Kang GRC and they won with 76.91% of the vote against the People's Power Party. On 1 October 2015, Low was appointed Parliamentary Secretary at the Ministry of Education and Ministry of Trade and Industry. In 2016, she appeared in an episode of the Channel 8 television series Eat Already?. On 1 May 2017, she was promoted to Senior Parliamentary Secretary and continued serving at the two Ministries. On 1 May 2018, she relinquished her appointment at the Ministry of Trade and Industry while continuing to serve at the Ministry of Education. In addition, she became Senior Parliamentary Secretary at the Ministry of Manpower.

In the 2020 general election, Low joined a four-member PAP team contesting in Chua Chu Kang GRC and they won with 58.64% of the vote against the Progress Singapore Party. On 27 July 2020, she was promoted to Minister of State and appointed to the Ministry of Trade and Industry and Ministry of Culture, Community and Youth.

Personal life 
Low is married with two sons.

References

External links
Low Yen Ling Bukit Gombak Website
 Low Yen Ling on Parliament of Singapore
CV at PAP website
Chua Chu Kang Town Council

Members of the Parliament of Singapore
People's Action Party politicians
1974 births
Living people
Temasek Junior College alumni
Nanyang Technological University alumni
Dunman High School alumni
Singaporean women in politics